Ramaria flava, is a yellow coral mushroom found in Europe.  Also known by its local name changle it is also native to temperate areas of southern Chile and south of Brazil (state of Rio Grande do Sul).

References

Gomphaceae
Fungi described in 1774
Fungi of Europe
Fungi of South America
Edible fungi
Taxa named by Jacob Christian Schäffer